The tropical rainforest understory shrub Piper cenocladum is a member of the same genus as kava, betel, and black pepper. It is a myrmecophyte, a plant that lives in ecological mutualism with ants. This plant and three or four other closely related species are known collectively as ant plants or ant pipers. This species has broad, bright green leaves and grows in dim, swampy areas deep in the rainforest of Costa Rica and surrounding countries.

This ant piper has hollow petioles which provide a home for ants, especially of the species Pheidole bicornis. The plant also produces food bodies that the ants use as their main food source. The ants in turn defend the plant against predation by herbivorous caterpillars and fungi. Adding to the complexity of this food web is the beetle Tarsobaenus letourneauae, a specialized predator which lives in the plant's petioles and feeds upon the ants and their eggs. This food web is an example of ecological top-down control, in which the top predator affects lower levels of the system. The beetle reduces the number of ants, which allows more herbivory to occur, causing foliage loss on the plant.

References

cenocladum
Myrmecophytes
Taxa named by Casimir de Candolle